Longstone Rath is a ringfort (rath) and National Monument located in County Tipperary, Ireland.

Location
Longstone Rath is located on a height overlooking the Barna–Emly road, 1.6 km (1 mile) west-southwest of Cullen.

History and archaeology
The longstone, a lump of limestone about 2.3 m (7′ 7″) in height, is located on a mound within a bivallate ringfort. The site was excavated in 1973–76, where 4,000 potsherds, 6 complete vessels, over 400 flint scrapers, cremated bones and grooved ware pottery were found. The mound is thought to date from c. AD 1 (mid-Iron Age), with the rath being added about AD 600.
According to Prof. Peter Danaher, Carrowkeel-style bowls from the complex site at Longstone seem to indicate a transitory camp of passage-tomb folk, and the hilltop was also used by Beaker, Food Vessel and Urn peoples, indicating that the site was a "halting site" for many thousands of years before the longstone and rath were made.

References

National Monuments in County Tipperary